Fraus latistria, the broad-striped ghost moth,  is a moth of the family Hepialidae. It is endemic to Tasmania.

References

Moths described in 1989
Hepialidae